Vadi is a village in Mustvee Parish, Jõgeva County in northeastern Estonia.

References

 

Villages in Jõgeva County